Dalla caicus is a species of butterfly in the family Hesperiidae. It is found in Venezuela and Peru.

Subspecies
Dalla caicus caicus - Venezuela
Dalla caicus inca Draudt, 1923 - Peru

References

Butterflies described in 1868
caicus
Hesperiidae of South America
Taxa named by William Chapman Hewitson